Wedderburn Castle, near Duns, Berwickshire, in the Scottish Borders, is an 18th-century country house that is now used as a wedding and events venue. The house is a Category A listed building and the grounds are included in the Inventory of Gardens and Designed Landscapes in Scotland.

History
Wedderburn Castle is the historic family seat of the Home of Wedderburn family, cadets of the Home family (today Earls of Home). It was designed and constructed 1771–1775 by the famous architect brothers Robert Adam and James Adam, with the work superintendent being architect James Nisbet of Kelso, for Patrick Home of Billie, who had already completed Paxton House (using James Adam and Nisbet from 1758, with Robert Adam doing the interiors ). With battlemented three-storey elevations in the typical Adam Castle style, the apparent symmetry of Wedderburn Castle conceals a rectangular courtyard, originally filled by the 17th-century (or earlier) tower house, also known as Wedderburn Castle, of which only a heraldic panel remains. It was demolished in the early 19th century, leaving the courtyard accessed through an archway at the back.

The approach

The castle is approached by way of the north or Lion Gate of 1794 designed by John Plaw and the long drive (leading from the West gate), which passes the 18th-century stables (a square court entered through a pedimented archway) and the stables cottages, before continuing to the castle. The former stables building is now used as a barn wedding and events venue. 

The West Gate is another archway, but defined by screen walls and gabled lodges.

The castle interior
Entering the front of the castle through a large porch (above which is the Home of Wedderburn coat of arms), there is a double staircase with an iron balustrade leading up to a balcony, behind which is a long gallery connecting the drawing room and the dining room. Across the hall and above the front door is a long minstrel gallery, again connecting the drawing room and the dining room. On the right of the staircase are the drawing room, and the morning room (previously the smoking room), beyond which is the ballroom. There are several fine chimneypieces, the best being in the drawing room of white Carrara marble and various other materials by Piranesi from 1774. To the left are the dining room, and a further staircase leading up to the bedrooms. The ground floor has a large kitchen and further bedrooms.

The owners
The Earls of Douglas had the feudal superiority of the lands of Wedderburn circa 1413, when Archibald Douglas, 4th Earl of Douglas granted them as a feu to "his esquire, David de Home". In a charter dated at Dunbar Castle 29 February 1413, George de Dunbar, Earl of March, confirmed the previous charter granted by "his beloved brother, Archibald, Earl of Douglas", the superiority having passed, by forfeiture, from the Dunbar family to Douglas.

By 1550 the Homes had acquired the superiority of Wedderburn, as is indicated by a Sasine in favour of David Home, brother-german (full brother) and heir of George Home of Wedderburn (who was killed at the Battle of Pinkie), wherein it is stated that the heir and his brother held it of the Crown in chief.

Mary, Queen of Scots came to Wedderburn Castle in November 1566 and rode to Halidon Hill. She met John Foster, Marshal of Berwick.

Daughters of this branch of the Home family would keep Home and add it to their married name – hence subsequent generations of the family having variations including Forman Home, Milne Home, Home Robertson, and Home Miller.  From 1898 until 1973, Wedderburn was let to the Arbuthnots. From 1973 until 2010 it was owned by Georgina Home Robertson. The current owners are David Home Miller and Catherine Macdonald-Home.

See also
List of places in the Scottish Borders

Citations

References

External links

GEOGRAPH image: Looking over Cairnhill lands through the haze to Wedderburn Castle

Country houses in the Scottish Borders
Castles in the Scottish Borders
Category A listed buildings in the Scottish Borders
Listed houses in Scotland
Berwickshire
Inventory of Gardens and Designed Landscapes
Robert Adam buildings